Johnnie van Gent (born 6 August 1930, died between 2017 and 2019) was a South African water polo player. He competed in the men's tournament at the 1952 Summer Olympics.

References

1930 births
2010s deaths
South African male water polo players
Olympic water polo players of South Africa
Water polo players at the 1952 Summer Olympics
Sportspeople from Johannesburg